Samuel Futhey Dale (July 15 1773 – September 1, 1842)  was an American surveyor, militia member, judge, and legislator from Pennsylvania. 

Dale was born in West Fallowfield Township, Chester County, Pennsylvania, the second of nine children of Samuel and Ann (Futhey) Dale. He was elected colonel of the 132d Regiment of the 1st Brigade and 14th Division (subsequently the 16th) in 1802, and in the War of 1812 led the regiment under commission from Governor Simon Snyder.

He was appointed by, deputy surveyor of Venango, Warren and Clarion counties in 1801, dividing them into thousand-acre tracts.  From 1807 to 1813 he was Representative of Venango and Mercer counties in the State Legislature. Colonel Dale also subdivided the greater part of the Holland Land Company property, later known as the Lancaster Land Company property, in Crawford, Erie, Venango, Warren, and what are now Clarion and Forest counties. Much of this surveying was done through almost impenetrable virgin forest. In 1813 he moved to Lancaster, where he filled many important public offices. In 1819 he was appointed by Governor Snyder associate judge of Lancaster County and, owing to the illness of the presiding judge, performed the duties of judge until his death in 1842.

Dale married Eliza Gundaker in 1812, and they were the parents of sixteen children, including judge Michael G. Dale and industrialist Samuel Futhey Dale, owner of the Samuel F. Dale House.

References

1773 births
1842 deaths
Members of the Pennsylvania House of Representatives
American surveyors
People from Lancaster County, Pennsylvania